The 2005 FIA WTCC Race Of Belgium was the sixth round of the 2005 World Touring Car Championship season. It was held at the Circuit de Spa-Francorchamps. Dirk Müller won the first race in a BMW 1-2-3 podium sweep, and also extended his points lead, whereas Fabrizio Giovanardi won a wet and crash-strewn second race from pole on the reversed grid for Alfa Romeo.

Race 1

Race 2

Standings after the races

Drivers' Championship standings

Manufacturers' Championship standings

References

External links

Belgium
2005 in Belgian motorsport